Ebony Wall is a dark, nearly vertical rock wall in Antarctica, which rises about  at the head of Pettus Glacier. It was charted in 1948 by the Falkland Islands Dependencies Survey who applied the descriptive name.

Map
 Trinity Peninsula. Scale 1:250000 topographic map No. 5697. Institut für Angewandte Geodäsie and British Antarctic Survey, 1996.

References 

 SCAR Composite Antarctic Gazetteer.

Landforms of Trinity Peninsula